Choti Si Kahani is a TV serial directed by Kamran Qureshi, written by Haseena Moin and produced by J.C. Anand's founded production house Eveready Pictures.

The serial is based on mistrust in marital life, discontinuation of females' education due to early age marriages and women's independence as wife. Also showing the ups and downs in the life of three women and their struggle.

Plot
Khalida, Rushna and Mishal were fellow school mates when, Munir Hussain, foreign qualified but mentally conservative son of a millionaire businessman had a crush on Khalida and marries her by threatening her family. She gives birth to a daughter Sanara which disappoints Munir who already have two daughters from first wife in the village.

Mishal, a daughter of poor hoarding painter, who dreamt of becoming a supermodel, loved Ramish, a boy from family friends. Mishal joined modelling and Ramish left country. Mishal is liked by a TV director Raheel. She encounters Ramish one day and finds that he is already married with two children but his wife died. They both start meeting again but Ramish's children disapprove her and Mishal then accepts Raheel's love.

Rushna became a top TV anchor. She married Ahmed who is an airline pilot and has a daughter Sawera. Their married life was ideal but an air hostess Nashmia, who likes Ahmed, comes in between.

Mishal's friend Rajal, a psychiatrist, one day meets Rushna with Mishal. He starts visiting Rushna's home, pretending to help her mentally in her married life crisis due to Nashmia. One day he expresses his love for Rushna. On hearing this Ahmed leaves home taking his daughter Sawera. Rushna insults Rajal and breaks her relations with him.

Ahmed decides to marry Nashmia but first wants his daughter to become familiar with Nashmia but both cannot accept each other. Ahmed is disappointed of Nashmia's behaviour and returns to Rushna who accepts him back as both admit their mistakes.

Khalida's mother, Amma Bi, comes to live with them after Munir's murder. Now there is no one to run the business as Khalida was a housewife and has no experience or education after school. She comes across Asif, the owner of neighbouring mill who liked her from first sight. Her textile mill needs material and she pawns her property. Unknown to Khlida, her Mill manager attains the fund from Asif.

Sanara is studying in Art College and admires her talented class fellow Sarim who belongs to a middle-class family. Sarim helps Khalida in designing textile for the mill and is given a job at the mill. Khalida learns that Sarim and Sanara love each other. Sanara is then engaged to Sarim. Khalida's mill starts doing good business and Asif gifts her the papers of her property which shocks her but she is happy.

Cast

Main cast 
 Nadia Hussain as Mishal Wasif
 Adnan Siddiqui as Ahmed
 Ayesha Khan as Rushna
 Sadia Imam as Khalida
 Farhan Ali Agha as Rajal
 Shamoon Abbasi as Ramish
 Saboor Ali as Sanara
 Noman Habib as Sarim

Supporting cast 
 Ali Afzal as Asif Sahab
 Rashid Farooqui as Muneer Hussain
 Hassan Ahmed as Raheel
 Tehreem Zuberi as Nashmia
 Durdana Butt as Amma Bi
 M. Ayub as Ramo Kaka
 Ushna as Sawera
 Naeem Shaikh as Baqar Sahab
 Nighat Sultana as Shabbo

Soundtrack
The theme songs was sung by Sara Raza Khan, composed by Farrukh Abid and lyricists was Sabir Zafar.

Awards and nominations
THE 3RD PAKISTAN MEDIA AWARDS
 Nominated - Best TV Serial (2012)
 Nominated - Best TV Drama OST (2012)
 Nominated - Best TV Writer (2012) - Haseena Moin
 Nominated - Best TV Director (2012) - Kamran Qureshi
 Nominated - Best TV Producer (2012) - Raheel Uddin Fareedi
 Nominated - Best TV Actress in a supporting role (2012) - Sadia Imam

See also
 Moorat
 Riyasat
 Makan
 Manzil
 Sarkar Sahab
 Ishq Ki Inteha
 Nestlé Nido Young Stars

References

External links
 
 Haseena Moin filmography: Choti Si Kahani 
 3rd Pakistan Media Award 2012 by movieshoovy
 Director's Website
 Facebook Page

Pakistani drama television series
Urdu-language television shows
Television shows set in Karachi
2011 Pakistani television series debuts